Rašín is a 2018 Czech historical two-part television film directed by Jiří Svoboda. It stars Ondřej Vetchý as Rašín. The film heavily focuses on Rašín's relationship with Karel Kramář. The film was originally scheduled for release on 28 October 2018 which is 100 years following the foundation of independent Czechoslovakia. Česká televize decided to divide the film to 2 parts. The first part premiered on 14 October 2018 while second on 21 October 2018.

Cast
 Ondřej Vetchý as Alois Rašín
 Miroslav Donutil as Karel Kramář
 Zuzana Stivínová as Karla Rašínová
 Lenka Vlasáková as Naděžda Kramářová
 Tomáš Töpfer as Markus Preminger 
 Viktor Preiss as Josef Scheiner
 Petr Štěpán as Přemysl Šámal
 Vítězslav Jandák as František Fiedler
 Ondřej Malý as Zdeněk Tobolka
 Jan Novotný as František Udržal
 Jiří Oberfalzer as Antonín Švehla
 Jaroslav Plesl as Edvard Beneš

References

External links
 
 

2018 television films
2010s Czech-language films
Czech historical films
Czech television films
Czech Television original films
2018 films
Films released in separate parts